The Muslim National Associations (MNA) was a Zionist-inspired and funded organization founded in Mandatory Palestine in the 1920s. It had branch offices in a number of Palestinian towns, and was led by the mayor of Haifa, Hassan Bey Shukri and Sheikh Musa Hadeib, head of the farmers' party of Mount Hebron.

According to the Israeli historian Benny Morris, the organization was Zionist-supported and formed as a counterweight to the nationalistic and anti-Zionist Muslim-Christian associations which had been formed in opposition to the Balfour Declaration and the creation of a Jewish National Home in Palestine.

Members
According to Huneidi, Kalvarisky had sought elements among the Arab political elite who opposed the Arab Executive Committee based on running personal and family feuds.

Hassan Bey Shukri was the mayor of Haifa and became the president of the Muslim National Associations. Musa Hadeib, from the village of Dawaymeh near Hebron, was also head of the Mount Hebron farmers' party.

Notes

References

History of Zionism
Muslim supporters of Israel
Organizations based in Mandatory Palestine
History of Palestine (region)
Zionism in Mandatory Palestine